Joe Ward (born 3 June 1980 in Dannevirke, Hawke's Bay, New Zealand) is a rugby union footballer who plays at hooker for Sale Sharks in the Aviva Premiership after signing from London Wasps in the Summer of 2011.

Career
Ward captained New Zealand U19 at the 1999 Junior World Championship, as well as representing the New Zealand U21 side in 2001.

Ward represented North Harbour in the National Provincial Championship.

Ward scored his only try for the Hurricanes against the Crusaders on his debut in the opening round of the 2003 Super 12 season.

Ward made 31 Super 12 appearances in all, generally as replacement for Andrew Hore his last appearance featuring in a 2005 Super 12 semi-final defeat to the Crusaders.

Ward joined London Wasps for the 2005–06 season. In his first season at the club, he was part of the Wasps side that won the Powergen Cup. He also achieved League success as Wasps won the final of the 2007–08 Guinness Premiership. Ward also played in the 2007 Heineken Cup Final, against the Leicester Tigers.

His club form led to Ward being named in the England Saxons squad for the 2008–2009 season on 1 July 2008. He subsequently made his England Saxons debut against , and also appeared in the final of the 2009 Churchill Cup.

In February 2011 it was announced Ward would join Sale Sharks on a 2-year contract for the 2011/12 season.

References

External links
Wasps profile

1980 births
Living people
Alumni of the University of St Andrews
English rugby union players
Hurricanes (rugby union) players
Massey University alumni
New Zealand people of English descent
North Harbour rugby union players
Otago Polytechnic alumni
Rugby union hookers
Rugby union players from Dannevirke
Wasps RFC players